Dubberman Oy is a Finnish dubbing company based in Helsinki. It is the Finnish branch of Dubberman. The company does dubbing for TV channels and film distributors.

References

External links 
 Dubberman Finland

Mass media companies of Finland
Companies based in Helsinki
Mass media in Helsinki